The 2000–01 Spartan South Midlands Football League season is the 4th in the history of Spartan South Midlands Football League a football competition in England.

At the end of the season the Senior Division was renamed Division One, while Division One was renamed Division Two.

Premier Division

The Premier Division featured 19 clubs which competed in the division last season, along with one new club:
Bedford United, promoted from the Senior Division

League table

Senior Division

The Senior Division featured 16 clubs which competed in the division last season, along with four new clubs:
Colney Heath, joined from the Herts County League
De Havilland, promoted from Division One
Dunstable Town, promoted from Division One
Harpenden Town, relegated from the Premier Division

Also, Bridger Packaging changed name to Letchworth Bridger.

At the end of the season the Senior Division was renamed Division One, while Division One was renamed Division Two.

League table

Division One

Division One featured 14 clubs which competed in the division last season, along with four new clubs.
Two clubs relegated from the Senior Division:
Caddington
Shillington

Two new clubs:
Haywood United
Milcutt Rovers

Also, Newport Athletic changed name to North Crawley United.

At the end of the season Division One was renamed Division Two, while the Senior Division was renamed Division One.

League table

References

External links
 FCHD Spartan South Midlands Football League page

2000–01
2000–01 in English football leagues